Arts & Sciences is home to the College of Arts & Sciences as well as graduate programs across its many departments. The current Dean of the Faculty is Feng Sheng Hu, the Lucille P. Markey Distinguished Professor in Arts & Sciences.

Arts & Sciences students have a strong track record in national and international fellowship competitions. For example, of Washington University's 11 Fulbright Scholarship recipients in 2011, 7 were recent alumni of the College of Arts & Sciences, and 3 were Arts & Sciences graduate students. Additionally, two students were selected as Rhodes Scholars in 2017-2018 and another student was a Rhodes Scholarship finalist in 2016.

College of Arts & Sciences
The College of Arts & Sciences is the central undergraduate unit of the university with 387 tenured and tenure-track faculty, 158 non-tenure track faculty (including lecturers, artists-in-residence, and visiting faculty), and 70 research scientists, serving about 4,000 undergraduates in 40 academic departments and programs divided into divisions of Humanities, Social Sciences, and Natural Sciences and Mathematics.  The College of Arts and Sciences is the largest undergraduate unit at Washington University, which is ranked 16th among national Universities by U.S. News & World Report. The College Office is currently led by Vice Dean of Undergraduate Affairs Erin McGlothlin.

Undergraduates in the other schools meet general education requirements by taking courses in the College of Arts & Sciences. Many of these students have double majors or minors in an Arts & Sciences discipline as well as in their professional field.

Arts & Sciences students are required to complete the Integrated Inquiry (IQ) Curriculum, a general-education curriculum. It includes a broad foundation of learning in “Core Skills” of writing, numeracy, and social thought, as well as the traditional “Areas” of the liberal arts: the humanities, social and behavioral sciences, natural sciences and math, and language and cultural diversity. The IQ Curriculum is designed to help students develop a distinctive academic plan, reflecting both intellectual curiosity and the enduring tradition of the liberal arts.

Undergraduates at the university are encouraged to participate in faculty research. Research is available in all areas of study in Arts & Sciences, and is available to students as early as their freshman year. An Undergraduate Research Journal is published semesterly, featuring the most outstanding projects from undergraduates. The Office of Undergraduate Research helps students find research opportunities that match their interests. Undergraduates can also apply for grants and awards from the university, which may be used towards their research endeavors.

James E. McLeod, lead the College of Arts & Sciences from 1992 to 2011. McLeod (b. 1944) had also served the university as Vice Chancellor for Students since 1995. He died September 7, 2011, of cancer.

Graduate programs
The graduate programs in Arts & Sciences serve over 1,500 students pursuing master's and Ph.D. degrees. Some of its many notable programs include Political Science, Creative Writing, Psychology, American and English Literature, Theater and Performance Studies, and the interdisciplinary degree in Philosophy-Neurosciences-Psychology.

References

External links
 Areas of Study in Arts and Sciences
 Office of Undergraduate Research

School of Arts and Sciences
Educational institutions established in 1853
University subdivisions in Missouri
1853 establishments in Missouri
Liberal arts colleges at universities in the United States